Darhata Sawabi is a Filipino weaver from Parang, Sulu known for pis syabit, a traditional Tausūg cloth tapestry worn as a head covering by the people of Jolo. She is a recipient of the National Living Treasures Award, having given the distinction in 2004. Pis refers to the geometric pattern that is said to be derived from the Indic mandala, and siyabit stands for the hook and technique.

Unmarried, Sawabi does weaving as a means of livelihood since farming, a common source of income for Parang families, is not sustainable for herself. Pis syabit weaving is a tedious work. It takes three days for the warp alone to be made. By age 48, she employs the help of apprentice weavers and children in her work. In the 1970s, she has to moved residence at least twice due to the Moro conflict. Sawabi died on March 12, 2005, about a year after she was given the National Living Treasures Award.

References

People from Sulu
Filipino weavers
2005 deaths
National Living Treasures of the Philippines